Catherine L. Mann is a member of the Monetary Policy Committee of the Bank of England. Before her appointment, she was the global chief economist at Citi from 2018 until 2021. She was also the chief economist at the OECD.

Education
Mann has a BA in economics, magna cum laude, from Harvard University in 1977. She then proceeded to MIT where she received a Ph.D. in international economics in 1984.

Career
Mann has worked as an economist in the Bush administration's Council of Economic Advisers where she advised on the European Monetary Union, Latin American economies and the transition economies of the former USSR.

She worked as an economist at the Federal Reserve, mainly in the bank's International Finance division.

Starting in 2006, Mann was a lecturer at Brandeis University and, in 2010, she was appointed Barbara '54 and Richard M. Rosenberg Professor of International Economics and Finance there. She left for the OECD in 2014.

Between 2014 and 2017, she was the chief economist and head of the economics department at the OECD.

Academic contribution
Mann's work has concentrated on U.S. trade deficit and exchange rate fluctuation of the U.S. dollar.

Publications

Books

Journal articles

References

External links
Personal website
Catherine on Twitter
Catherine on IDEAS/RePEc
Appearances on C-SPAN

Year of birth missing (living people)
Living people
American women economists
American economists
International economists
George H. W. Bush administration personnel
Federal Reserve economists
Harvard University alumni
MIT School of Humanities, Arts, and Social Sciences alumni